Thomas Henry Atherton (8 January 1879 – 1955) was an English professional footballer who played in the Scottish League for Partick Thistle, Motherwell, Dundee and St Bernard's as an outside right. He also played in England for Brentford, Tottenham Hotspur and Grimsby Town.

Personal life
Atherton was the son of Samuel Atherton and Ann Williams and was the older brother of footballer Bobby Atherton. Atherton married Rachel Steedman Scott in Morningside in 1903 and they had three children.

Career statistics

References

1879 births
English footballers
Footballers from Liverpool
Brentford F.C. players
English Football League players
Association football outside forwards
Tottenham Hotspur F.C. players
1955 deaths
Dundee Wanderers F.C. players
Hibernian F.C. players
St Bernard's F.C. players
Raith Rovers F.C. players
Partick Thistle F.C. players
Southern Football League players
Dundee F.C. players
Grimsby Town F.C. players
Motherwell F.C. players
Scottish Football League players
Scottish Football League representative players
People from West Derby
Grimsby Town F.C. non-playing staff